Nancy Blachman (born 1956 in Palo Alto, CA) is an American educator, supporter of recreational mathematics and mathematical outreach, software book author, and supporter of indie documentary films. In 2007, she founded the Julia Robinson Mathematics Festival (JRMF), which has grown into a successful math enrichment enterprise for teenagers in the USA and beyond.  She is a former chair of Gathering 4 Gardner and is still an active board member. She is currently Chair of the Advisory Board of Berkeley’s Industrial Engineering and Operations Research Department (IEOR).

Education and career
Nancy Blachman was born in 1956 in Palo Alto, California, her father Nelson being an electrical engineer. The family spent some time living in Spain in the 1960s, and Nancy's interest in mathematics began during high school back in Palo Alto when she took a course based on George Polya's
Mathematics and Plausible Reasoning. She was also inspired by the mathematics contest produced by Saint Mary's College of California then popular with secondary schools throughout the San Francisco Bay Area.

Blachman did undergraduate work at University of California, San Diego (1974 to 1976), got honours B.Sc. in applied mathematics from the University of Birmingham in the UK (1978), an M.S. in operations research from University of California, Berkeley (1979) and an M.S. in computer science at Stanford University (1988).

She taught a course in problem solving with Mathematica at Stanford from 1990 to 1997.

In 2004 she created Google Guide, an online interactive tutorial and reference about the capabilities of Google.

In 2005 while attending an education forum that promoted STEM [Science, Technology, Engineering, and Math] she remembered how the Saint Mary's College Mathematics Contest had inspired her as a student. Working with Joshua Zucker and Jim Sotiros she decided to revive the structure and spirit of this long defunct competition. This led to the founding of the Julia Robinson Mathematics Festival in 2007.  JRMF events now occur throughout the United States and have reached more than 100,000 students worldwide.

Blachman has been a board member of Gathering 4 Gardner since 2008 and served as its chair from 2012 to 2020.

She is currently the president and founder of Variable Symbols, a company that provides training, books, and tools to make complex software easier to use.

She has co-produced over a dozen indie films and documentaries, including The Price (2017), The Infiltrators (2019), and Eddy's World (2020).

Personal life
On January 1, 1999, she married David desJardins. They have two children, Sarah and Louis.

Books
 The Mathematica Graphics Guidebook, by Cameron Smith and Nancy Blachman, Addison Wesley (1995), 
 Mathematica: A Practical Approach, by Nancy Blachman and Colin Williams, Prentice-Hall (1993) 
 Mathematica quick reference, version 2, by Nancy Blachman, Addison-wesley (1992), 
 Maple V Quick Reference, by N. Blachman and M. Mossinghoff, Brooks/Cole Pub. Co (1992)

References

External links
 An Interview with Nancy Blachman by Gord! Hamilton - YouTube

Recreational mathematicians
Mathematics educators
Women educators
American documentary film producers
Stanford University alumni
University of California, Berkeley alumni
Alumni of the University of Birmingham
University of California, San Diego alumni
Oberlin College faculty
Stanford University faculty
Living people
1956 births